Oughterard GAA is a Gaelic football club based in Oughterard, County Galway, Ireland. The Gaelic Athletic Association club is a member of the Galway GAA. Oughterard had a hurling team in the 1920s but is primarily and always has been a Gaelic football club and teams compete from the groups of under 6 to Senior.

The club facilities are situated in Corribdale which is on the Pier Road in the town of Oughterard and it includes two pitches, a full-size walled pitch, a training pitch, a 600 capacity covered stand, a small terrace, changing rooms fit for 4 teams and meeting rooms with kitchen facilities. There is also a large car park that is in use by people using the surrounding Corribdale Trails.

History

Foundation 
Oughterard GAA was founded in 1908 by a group of local men with an interest in the sport. Gaelic football was brought to the town by a man called Mahony from County Tipperary.

County Championships 
Oughterard's first county success was the 1919 Junior Title, captained by John Joe D’Arcy from Maghera. The club takes its name from a member of that team, Seamus O Maille, a staunch member up to his execution in 1923.

1938 brought the club its first, and so far, only senior county title with a win over Ballinasloe captained by Pat Gibbons whose son John designed the club crest. This team included the four O’Sullivan brothers, Dinny, Tom, Charlie and Edward, supported by the O’Toole brothers and including All-Ireland medalist Frank Burke (Doorus) and Henry Kenny an All Ireland medalist with Mayo.

Celebrity Bainisteoir 
In 2011, Oughterard's Intermediate team took part in RTE's Celebrity Bainisteoir. Oughterard played St Patrick's GAA of Donobate in County Dublin at home in Corribdale and won. They then played Lissan GAC, Derry GAA in the Semi-final at home and won again. In the final they took on Killeshin GAA, County Laois and at full time it was 0–12 to 0–12. Extra time was played and Killeshin came out on top with a score of 0–18 to 0–15.

All-Ireland Intermediate Winners 2019/20 
On Saturday 25 January 2020, Oughterard's Intermediate Team won the All Ireland Intermediate Club Championship Final.

Cumann Peile Séamus O'Maille 
Oughterard are in the West Board area of the Galway League and Championships at Junior & Juvenile level, and take part in all under-age and Junior competitions in the county. Their flagship team is their Senior team which plays competitively in the All County Senior League Div 2.

Oughterard also has a Ladies' Gaelic football club, with 150 ladies of all ages playing competitively and with a degree of success despite being only 4 years in existence.

Crest 
The Cumann Peile Seamus O'Maille Uachtar Árd crest was designed by the local artist and former player John Thomas Gibbons. The crest consists of the bridge over the Owenriff river with the Catholic church behind it, a portrait of Seamus O'Maille and a salmon representing the Lough Corrib. The colours green and white are also in the crest, these are the colours of the club. The crest won the overall award at the National Féile in 2004.

Notable players
Matthew Tierney, appointed Galway senior vice-captain in 2022

References

Gaelic football clubs in County Galway
Gaelic games clubs in County Galway